Kwak Do-won (born Kwak Byung-kyu on May 17, 1973) is a South Korean actor.

Career
Kwak is known for his roles in the films The Yellow Sea (2010), Nameless Gangster: Rules of the Time (2012), The Attorney (2013), The Wailing (2016), Asura: The City of Madness (2016), Steel Rain (2017) and the television series ''Phantom (2012).

In May 2019, Kwak signed with new agency Mada Entertainment.Later in July 2022, Kwak renewed his contract with Mada Entertainment.

Filmography

Film

Television

Web series

Theater

Awards and nominations

References

External links
 
 
 

1973 births
Living people
South Korean male film actors
South Korean male stage actors
South Korean male television actors
21st-century South Korean male actors